In geometry, a spherical polyhedron or spherical tiling is a tiling of the sphere in which the surface is divided or partitioned by great arcs into bounded regions called spherical polygons. Much of the theory of symmetrical polyhedra is most conveniently derived in this way.

The most familiar spherical polyhedron is the soccer ball, thought of as a spherical truncated icosahedron. The next most popular spherical polyhedron is the beach ball, thought of as a hosohedron. 

Some "improper" polyhedra, such as hosohedra and their duals, dihedra, exist as spherical polyhedra, but their flat-faced analogs are degenerate.

History
The first known man-made polyhedra are spherical polyhedra carved in stone. Many have been found in Scotland, and appear to date from the neolithic period (the New Stone Age).

During the 10th Century, the Islamic scholar Abū al-Wafā' Būzjānī (Abu'l Wafa) wrote the first serious study of spherical polyhedra.

Two hundred years ago, at the start of the 19th Century, Poinsot used spherical polyhedra to discover the four regular star polyhedra.

In the middle of the 20th Century, Coxeter used them to enumerate all but one of the uniform polyhedra, through the construction of kaleidoscopes (Wythoff construction).

Examples
All regular polyhedra, semiregular polyhedra, and their duals can be projected onto the sphere as tilings:

Improper cases
Spherical tilings allow cases that polyhedra do not, namely hosohedra: figures as {2,n}, and dihedra: figures as {n,2}. Generally, regular hosohedra and regular dihedra are used.

Relation to tilings of the projective plane
Spherical polyhedra having at least one inversive symmetry are related to projective polyhedra (tessellations of the real projective plane) – just as the sphere has a 2-to-1 covering map of the projective plane, projective polyhedra correspond under 2-fold cover to spherical polyhedra that are symmetric under reflection through the origin.

The best-known examples of projective polyhedra are the regular projective polyhedra, the quotients of the centrally symmetric Platonic solids, as well as two infinite classes of even dihedra and hosohedra:
 Hemi-cube, {4,3}/2
 Hemi-octahedron, {3,4}/2
 Hemi-dodecahedron, {5,3}/2
 Hemi-icosahedron, {3,5}/2
 Hemi-dihedron, {2p,2}/2, p>=1
 Hemi-hosohedron, {2,2p}/2, p>=1

See also

Spherical geometry
Spherical trigonometry
Polyhedron
Projective polyhedron
Toroidal polyhedron
Conway polyhedron notation

References

Further reading

Polyhedra
Tessellation
Spheres